Garra congoensis (Congo logsucker) is a small species of ray-finned fish in the genus Garra. It is native to fast-flowing sections of the lower Congo River in Africa.

References 

Garra
Fish described in 1959
Taxa named by Max Poll